Die Wochenshow (English: The Weekly Show, lit.: The Week's Review) was a German weekly sketch comedy show that aired on Sat.1 and was produced by Brainpool TV. It first aired on 20 April 1996 and was cancelled early in 2002. The show saw a brief revival starting on 20 May 2011, but only eight episodes were broadcast before it was cancelled due to low ratings and bad press.

Format 
The show is a news parody with sketches and recurring characters that often that parody popular celebrities, TV shows and films. It bears similarities to formats such as Not the Nine O'Clock News and Saturday Night Live.

The title of the show is a play on Die Deutsche Wochenschau (a wartime cinema newsreel) and Germany's most prestigious TV news program, Tagesschau. Ingolf Lück has occasionally described the show as a modern version of Rudis Tagesshow, a news parody show broadcast from ARD and hosted by Rudi Carrell in the 1980s.

History 
The original cast consisted of Ingolf Lück, Anke Engelke, Marco Rima and Bastian Pastewka. In 1999 Marco Rima was replaced by Markus Maria Profitlich and in 2000 Annette Frier replaced Anke Engelke, who left the show to pursue her own projects. in 2001, Michael Kessler and Bürger Lars Dietrich joined the cast. The show was a big ratings success from its beginning and still has a cult following, but was cancelled in 2002 following a drop in ratings.

The 2011 revival cast included Ingolf Lück, Dave Davis, Friederike Kempter, Axel Stein, Matthias Matschke, Carolin Kebekus, Matze Knop and Dominik Kuhn.

References

External links

German comedy television series
1996 German television series debuts
2002 German television series endings
German-language television shows
Sat.1 original programming